Remigiusz Mróz (born 15 January 1987, Opole, Poland) is a Polish writer and lawyer. He is considered a popular and prolific author having published 46 novels since his first books appeared in 2013.  As of early 2019, none of his works have been published in an English translation.

Life
Remigiusz Mróz went to high school in Opole and attended college at Leon Kozminski University in Warsaw, where he studied law. He is also the author of numerous research studies.

Works
Mróz has written in different genres including crime, legal thrillers, and science fiction.  He was recognized as the most popular contemporary Polish author by the 2017 and 2018 National Reading Survey. In 2019 he became the most popular author in Poland, surpassing Stephen King and Polish Nobel Prize winners. His books are bestsellers in the Polish publishing market, and his suspenseful work gets compared to Stephen King and Alfred Hitchcock.

He has written a number of book series, including the series featuring Joanna Chyłka, Police Chief – Forst, Parabellum, W kręgach władzy, which has been made into a TV show starring Magdalena Cielecka on TVN.  Other series are also in development for screen adaptation.

Mróz was the first Polish writer to receive two nominations for the Great Caliber Award at the International Detective Story Festival for Kasacja (Final Appeal) and Zaginięcie (Disappearance). The first won the Reader's Choice Award.  This series of novels focused on lawyer Joanna Chyłka have sold over 1.5 million copies in Poland.

He has also written three novels set in the Faroe Islands under the pen name Ove Løgmansbø.

Joanna Chyłka series
 Kasacja (Final Appeal), Wydawnictwo Czwarta Strona, Poznań 2015
 Zaginięcie (Disappearance), Wydawnictwo Czwarta Strona, Poznań 2015
 Rewizja (Revision), Wydawnictwo Czwarta Strona, Poznań 2016
 Immunitet (Immunity), Wydawnictwo Czwarta Strona, Poznań 2016
 Inwigilacja (Invigilation), Wydawnictwo Czwarta Strona, Poznań 2017
 Oskarżenie (Accusation), Wydawnictwo Czwarta Strona, Poznań 2017
 Testament (Last Will), Wydawnictwo Czwarta Strona, Poznań 2018
 Kontratyp (Justification), Wydawnictwo Czwarta Strona, Poznań 2018
 Umorzenie (Remission), Wydawnictwo Czwarta Strona, Poznań 2019
 Wyrok (Verdict), Wydawnictwo Czwarta Strona, Poznań 2019
 Ekstradycja (Extradition), Wydawnictwo Czwarta Strona, Poznań 2020
 Precedens (Precedent), Wydawnictwo Czwarta Strona, Poznań 2020
 Afekt (Affect), Wydawnictwo Czwarta Strona, Poznań 2021
 Egzekucja (Execution), Wydawnictwo Czwarta Strona, Poznań 2021

Forst series 
 Ekspozycja (Exposure), Wydawnictwo Filia, Poznań 2015
 Przewieszenie (Overhang), Wydawnictwo Filia, Poznań 2016
 Trawers (Traverse), Wydawnictwo Filia, Poznań 2016
 Deniwelacja (Denivelation), Wydawnictwo Filia, Poznań 2017
 Zerwa (Rockslide), Wydawnictwo Filia, Poznań 2018
 Halny (Foehn), Wydawnictwo Filia, Poznań 2020

Parabellum trilogy 
 Prędkość ucieczki (Escape Velocity), Instytut Wydawniczy Erica, Warszawa 2013
 Horyzont zdarzeń (Event Horizon), Instytut Wydawniczy Erica, Warszawa 2014
 Głębia osobliwości (Depth of Singularity), Wydawnictwo Czwarta Strona, Poznań 2016

W kręgach władzy (In the Circles of Power) series 
 Wotum nieufności (Vote of no Confidence), Wydawnictwo Filia, Poznań 2017
 Większość bezwzględna (Absolute Majority), Wydawnictwo Filia, Poznań 2017
 Władza absolutna (Absolute Power), Wydawnictwo Filia, Poznań 2018

Damian Werner series 
 Nieodnaleziona (The Girl Who Was Never Found), Wydawnictwo Filia, Poznań 2018
 Nieodgadniona (The Inscrutable Girl), Wydawnictwo Filia, Poznań 2019

Seweryn Zaorski series 
 Listy zza grobu (Letters from Beyond the Grave), Wydawnictwo Filia, Poznań 2019
 Głosy z zaświatów (The Voices from the Nether World), Wydawnictwo Filia, Poznań 2020
 Szepty spoza nicości (Whispers from beyond nothingness), Wydawnictwo Filia, Poznań 2021

Gerard Edling series 
 Behawiorysta (The Behaviorist), Wydawnictwo Filia, Poznań 2016
 Iluzjonista (The Illusionist), Wydawnictwo Filia, Poznań 2019
 Ekstremista (The Extremist), Wydawnictwo Filia, Poznań 2021

Chór zapomnianych głosów (The Choir of Forgotten Voices) series 
 Chór zapomnianych głosów (The Choir of Forgotten Voices), Wydawnictwo Genius Creations, Bydgoszcz 2014
 Echo z otchłani (The Echo from the Abyss), Wydawnictwo Czwarta Strona, Poznań 2020

Novels published as Ove Løgmansbø – Trilogy from the Faroe Islands 
 Enklawa (The Enclave), Wydawnictwo Dolnośląskie, 2016
 Połów (The Haul), Wydawnictwo Dolnośląskie, 2016
 Prom (The Ferry), Wydawnictwo Dolnośląskie, 2017

Other novels
 Wieża milczenia (The Tower of Silence), Wydawnictwo Damidos, Katowice 2013
 Turkusowe szale (Turquoise Shawls), Wydawnictwo Bellona, Warszawa 2014
 W cieniu prawa (In the Shadow of the Law), Wydawnictwo Czwarta Strona, Poznań 2016
 Świt, który nie nadejdzie (The Dawn That Will Never Come), Wydawnictwo Czwarta Strona, Poznań 2016
 Czarna Madonna (Black Madonna), Wydawnictwo Czwarta Strona, Poznań 2017
 Hashtag, Wydawnictwo Czwarta Strona, Poznań 2018
 O pisaniu na chłodno (Coldly About Writing), Wydawnictwo Czwarta Strona, Poznań 2018
 Wybaczam ci (I Forgive You), Wydawnictwo Czwarta Strona, Poznań 2021

References 

1987 births
Living people
People from Opole
21st-century Polish lawyers
Polish male novelists
21st-century Polish novelists
21st-century Polish male writers